Sakshi TV is an Indian Telugu-language 24-hour news channel. It was launched on 1 March 2009, by Indira Television Ltd. owned by Y. S. Jagan Mohan Reddy.

It is currently run under the chairmanship of Y. S. Bharathi Reddy, wife of Jagan Mohan Reddy. The media group also owns the Telugu daily newspaper, Sakshi.

The channel is widely regarded as a propaganda outlet for Jagan Mohan Reddy and his party YSR Congress Party (YCP). It is criticized for its biased coverage of the political rivals of Reddy and YCP. Sakshi TV has been found to be in breach of the News Broadcasting Standards Authority (NBSA) code of ethics on various occasions.

On 20th January 2022, Ministry of Home Affairs, Govt. of India had denied security clearance to M/s Indira Television Limited d/b/a Sakshi TV along with another Malayalam television channel Media One based on intelligence inputs received from various Union Govt. agencies and thereby Ministry of Information and Broadcasting, Govt. of India issued the Order dated 20.01.2022 vide. F. No 1404/59(ii)2008-TV(I)Pt(I) cancelling the permission granted to M/s Indira Television Limited d/b/a Sakshi TV to be in the list of permitted private satellite TV channels in India. The channel had filed a Writ Petition at Telangana High Court and is surviving on a temporary stay until further hearing and another extension of the same on 08/08/2022 as Union Govt. of India had in the past stated "Security clearance must for operating private TV channels".

History
The channel started airing on 1 March 2009. It is promoted by Indira Television Ltd., with Y. S. Jagan Mohan Reddy, son of then Chief Minister of Andhra Pradesh, Y. S. Rajashekhara Reddy, as the Chairman. According to a CBI chargesheet filed against Jagan Mohan Reddy, the investments in his media companies were quid pro quo bribes by those people who had benefited from their unfair deals with his father's government.

The channel was initially named Indira Priyadarsini. According to Ramakrishna Reddy, the first Editor-in-Chief of the channel, it was renamed to cash in on the popularity of the Sakshi newspaper which was launched a year before the channel by Jagan Mohan Reddy. At its launch, the channel claimed to be the first HDTV channel in the country. It was marketed as being primarily targeted at the youth.

Of the nearly 40 crore Government of Andhra Pradesh spent on ads in electronic media for the years 2009-12, Sakshi TV got advertisements worth over 17 crore. This was attributed to the undue preferential treatment Sakshi TV and Sakshi newspaper received during the chief ministership of Y. S. Rajasekhara Reddy.

It is currently run under the chairmanship of Y. S. Bharathi Reddy, wife of Jagan Mohan Reddy. In January 2019, Sakshi Media Group appointed Vinay Maheshwari as its Executive Director and CEO. Maheshwari exited the company in March 2022.

Content 
Sakshi TV broadcasts regional, national, and international news. It also has programmes on restaurant reviews, automobiles, cookery and entertainment.

Criticism 
The channel is widely perceived as a propaganda outlet for Jagan Mohan Reddy. It is criticized for its biased coverage of the political rivals of Reddy and his party YSR Congress Party. Sakshi TV has been found to be in breach of the News Broadcasting Standards Authority (NBSA) code of ethics on various occasions.

Rajasekhara Reddy's death and conspiracy theory

In January 2010, Sakshi TV broadcast a conspiracy theory by the American journalist Mark Ames in the Russian online tabloid The eXile, on the death of Y. S. Rajasekhara Reddy, father of Sakshi TV promoter Y. S. Jagan Mohan Reddy, in a helicopter crash on 2 September 2009. It alleged that Ambani brothers of Reliance group of companies orchestrated the death of Rajasekhara Reddy. TV5 channel broke the story while Sakshi TV and NTV relayed the report aired by TV5.

The report led to massive attacks against the business establishments owned by the two Ambani brothers in Andhra Pradesh. On 8 January 2010, criminal cases were filed against Sakshi TV and NTV while two senior journalists of TV5 were arrested. Editors Guild of India asked the channels to desist from "irresponsible reporting" and condemned the reporting as sensational and against the principles of journalism.

See also 
 Sakshi (media group)

References

External links
 

Telugu-language television channels
24-hour television news channels in India
Television channels and stations established in 2009
Television stations in Hyderabad
YSR Congress Party
2009 establishments in Andhra Pradesh